Daniel Elmen (born Daniil Semyonov; December 29, 1885, Ismender, Yadrinsky Uyezd, Kazan Governorate, Russian Empire – September 3, 1932, Ilyinka, Chuvash ASSR, USSR) was a Chuvash state and political figure, the first Chairman of the Chuvash regional executive committee (1920–1921). Elmen contributed to the development of public education and cultural institutions in Chuvashia.

Literature 
 Иванов М. И. Даниил Эльмень: острые грани судьбы. — Cheboksary: Chuvash Book Publishers, 2009. — 255 с. 
 Николаев В. Н., Лялина Л. В. Д. С. Эльмень (Семенов). Его роль в становлении и развитии Чувашской национальной государственности. Cheboksary, 2008.

References

External links 
 Государственные и политические деятели: Эльмень (Семенов) Даниил Семенович
 
 Даниил Эльмень - герой или аутсайдер чувашской истории?

1885 births
1932 deaths
People from Yadrinsky District
People from Yadrinsky Uyezd
Left socialist-revolutionaries
Bolsheviks
Chuvash people
Soviet politicians
Simbirsk Chuvash teacher's school alumni
Institute of Red Professors alumni